İkizçın is a village in the district of Ermenek, Karaman Province in Turkey.

The city dates from Roman times and was formerly known as İrnebol" and in ancient time as Irenopolis.

The nearby village of  Çatalbadem  was formerly known as Yukarı İrnebol meaning  "upper Irenopolis" and İkizçınar was (formerly Aşağı İrnebol meaning "Irenopolis from below".

The village is known for its Almond trees.

References
 

Isauria
Roman towns and cities in Turkey
Ancient Greek archaeological sites in Turkey
Villages in Ermenek District